The 2010 election for Mayor of Newark took place in Newark, the most populous city in the state of New Jersey, on May 11, 2010. Elections for all seats on the nine member Municipal Council of Newark were held the same day. A runoff election, if necessary, would have taken place. Elections in the city are non-partisan and candidates are not listed by political party. Incumbent Mayor  Cory Booker avoided a runoff and was re-elected to his second term in office.

Booker would not serve out the entirety of his second term. In 2013, after having won the October 16 special election for U.S. senator, Booker resigned as mayor and was sworn in on October 31 as the junior U.S. senator from New Jersey. Luis A. Quintana, long-term member of the Municipal Council, replaced him as interim mayor. In 2019, he mounted a campaign to participate in 2020 Democratic Party presidential primaries.

Results
If no candidate had received 50% of the vote, the race would have continued to a run-off between the top two candidates from the first round.

References

External links

Cory Booker
2010
2010 United States mayoral elections
Newark